Sallie Updyke Mundy  (born June 29, 1962) is an associate justice of the Pennsylvania Supreme Court and a former judge of the Pennsylvania Superior Court.

Early life and education
She was born in Elmira, New York and was raised in Tioga, Pennsylvania.
In 1984, she graduated from Washington & Jefferson College. In 1987, she graduated from University of Pittsburgh School of Law.

Legal career
From 1987 to 1988, Munday served in a judicial clerkship under the Honorable Robert M. Kemp, President Judge of the Tioga County Courts of Common Pleas. In 1988, she entered private practice, working as a defense attorney in the field of medical malpractice.

Employed as an attorney with the firm of McQuade Blasko in State College, Pennsylvania from 1988 to 1985, she briefly worked as an attorney for the law offices of Stephen Ryan in Bala Cynwyd from 1995 too 1996 and Swartz Campbell & Detweiler in Philadelphia from 1996 to 1998 before securing her position as an attorney with the Philadelphia law firm, McEldrew & Fullam, where she worked from 1998 to 2009.

A past chair of the Disciplinary Hearing Committee, on which she served as a member from 1995 to 2001, Mundy was also a member of the board of directors of the Pennsylvania Interest on Lawyer Trust Accounts (IOLTA) from 1997 to 2003.

From 2008 to 2009, she served as a volunteer public defender.

From 2010 to 2016, Mundy served as a judge with the Superior Court of Pennsylvania. In 2014, she participated with two of her superior court colleagues, Judge Cheryl Lynn Allen and Judge Christine L. Donohue, in a special argument session hosted by the Pennsylvania State University's Dickinson School of Law at University Park from April 1 to 2. The special outreach session was designed to help educate high school, college students and members of the general public about the operations of Pennsylvania's superior court system, and gave attendees the opportunity to witness more than thirty cases related to civil, criminal, and family law.

Pennsylvania Supreme Court
Mundy was appointed by Governor Tom Wolf to the seat vacated by Justice J. Michael Eakin on the Pennsylvania Supreme Court and confirmed on June 27, 2016.
On November 8, 2017, Justice Mundy defeated Dwayne Woodruff to gain a ten-year term on the Pennsylvania Supreme Court.

Awards and honors
Mundy has been recognized for her professional and public service activities by multiple organizations, including:

The Legal Intelligencer’s award for Top Women in Law, 2016
Washington & Jefferson College's W. Edward Sell ’45 Legal Achievement Award, 2016

Memberships and other associations
Mundy has been a member of the following organizations:

National Association of Women Judges
Pennsylvania, Philadelphia and Tioga Bar Associations
Pennsylvania Bar Association Insurance Trust (trustee, 1997-2008) 
Pennsylvania Bar Association House of Delegates (member, 1996-2008) 
Pennsylvania Bar Young Lawyer’s Division Zone 11 (chair, 1993-95; at-large chair, 1995-96) 
Pennsylvania Bar Association Commission on Women in the Profession 
Pennsylvania Bar Foundation Commonwealth Club

Personal life
She is part-owner of a small cattle farm, raising Scottish Highland cattle, in Tioga County.

References

1962 births
Living people
Judges of the Superior Court of Pennsylvania
Pennsylvania Republicans
Pennsylvania lawyers
Politicians from Elmira, New York
People from Wellsboro, Pennsylvania
Superior court judges in the United States
Justices of the Supreme Court of Pennsylvania
University of Pittsburgh School of Law alumni
Washington & Jefferson College alumni
21st-century American judges
21st-century American women judges